Jackson Raine (born 24 February 1974) is an Australian actor.  He is best known for playing Tao in the action/fantasy series Beastmaster.

Career
Raine's career began 1998 with his role in Australian TV drama All Saints. He is better known for playing Tao in the TV show Beastmaster, where he starred alongside Daniel Goddard, for the series' three seasons.  He appeared in the American film The Great Raid.

Television

References

External links
 

1974 births
Living people
Australian male television actors